Soliton Incorporated is a Canadian company formed in 1993 to continue supporting and developing the programming language Sharp APL, and related products and services, originally developed by Canadian company I. P. Sharp Associates.

History
Soliton was formed in 1993 in Toronto, Ontario, Canada with Clarke Bruce as president, and with some of the former employees of I. P. Sharp Associates.  The business was in some ways a continuation of parts of I. P. Sharp, which was bought by Reuters Group in 1987.  Reuters was interested mainly in Sharp's historic databases, and allowed some parts of the business to buy themselves out from Reuters.

Timeline
 1987 – I. P. Sharp Associates is bought by Reuters
 1993 – Soliton Incorporated is founded
 1997 – Soliton develops TimeSquare, a timeseries database with an SQL-like syntax
 2006 – TimeSquare business sold to SunGard, becoming part of their referencePoint EDM business

See also
 Kenneth E. Iverson
 Eugene McDonnell

External links 

 APL programming language - Chronology

Technology companies of Canada